Jagoba Arrasate Elustondo (born 22 April 1978) is a Spanish former footballer who played as a forward, currently manager of CA Osasuna.

After an amateur playing career, he rose through the coaching ranks of Real Sociedad where he made his La Liga debut in 2013, also leading Osasuna in the top flight and taking the latter club to the Segunda División title in 2019.

Playing career
Born in Berriatua, Biscay, Arrasate only played for lower league clubs during his ten-year senior career, the majority in Tercera División and all in his native Basque Country. In Segunda División B he represented SD Eibar B and Club Portugalete, being relegated with the latter team at the end of the 2005–06 campaign.

Arrasate retired in 2007 at only 29, after one season in the fourth tier with SD Amorebieta.

Coaching career

Real Sociedad
Arrasate became a coach immediately after retiring, his first two clubs being amateur. In 2010, he returned to Real Sociedad where he had been groomed, being appointed coach of the youth teams.

In July 2012, Arrasate was promoted to Real's first team as assistant to Philippe Montanier. The following year, as the Frenchman left for Stade Rennais FC, he was named his successor. He led the team in their 2013–14 UEFA Champions League campaign, in which they defeated Olympique Lyonnais to qualify for the group stage, but finished bottom of the section.

In April 2014, Arrasate had his contract renewed until 2016. However, in November, he was relieved of his duties after a string of poor results.

Numancia
Arrasate was appointed at the helm of CD Numancia on 12 June 2015, replacing Juan Antonio Anquela. In the 2017–18 campaign, he led the Sorians to the finals of the play-offs, but missed out promotion after a 4–1 aggregate loss to Real Valladolid; he stepped down on 18 June 2018.

Osasuna
On 20 June 2018, Arrasate was named CA Osasuna manager after agreeing to a one-year contract. He renewed his contract until 2020 the following 5 March, and achieved promotion to La Liga as champions.

Arrasate signed another new deal on 18 November 2019, tying him to the Rojillos until June 2022. Six days later the team lost 2–1 at home to local rivals Athletic Bilbao, ending a club-best 602 days unbeaten at the El Sadar Stadium.

On 7 March 2022, Arrasate's contract was extended for two more years, with the news being broken through a banner on the Avenida Carlos III in Pamplona. In the ensuing season, he led Osasuna to the Copa del Rey semi-finals for the first time in 18 years after a 2–1 extra-time win at home to Sevilla FC.

Personal life
On 12 August 2020, Arrasate tested positive for COVID-19.

Managerial statistics

Honours

Manager
Osasuna
Segunda División: 2018–19

Individual
La Liga Manager of the Month: December 2013

References

External links

1978 births
Living people
People from Lea-Artibai
Sportspeople from Biscay
Spanish footballers
Footballers from the Basque Country (autonomous community)
Association football forwards
Segunda División B players
Tercera División players
Divisiones Regionales de Fútbol players
SD Eibar footballers
SD Lemona footballers
SD Beasain footballers
Club Portugalete players
SD Amorebieta footballers
Spanish football managers
La Liga managers
Segunda División managers
Tercera División managers
Real Sociedad managers
CD Numancia managers
CA Osasuna managers
Real Sociedad non-playing staff